Dr. D. P. Singh (nee Dr. Devinder Pal Singh), born 1956, is an Indo-Canadian scientist, educationist, author science fiction writer, Sikh theologian, and TV host. As a widely travelled person, mostly for his academic research, and promotion of science in developing countries, he has published about 100 research papers in Acoustics, Polymer Physics, Condensed Matter Physics and Material Science. Besides, he has published over 1000 general articles on the topics related to Science, Environment and Religion.

Due to his outstanding contributions for the cultivation of scientific temper and environmental awareness among people, the Peace on Earth Organization, Canada, in 2010, honored him with the "Life Time Achievement Award". Though he writes in English and Punjabi, his works have also been translated into Hindi, Shahmukhi, and Marathi languages.

Early life 
Born in 1956, at Hoshiarpur, Punjab, India, Devinder received M.Sc. (Physics) degree from Panjab University, Chandigarh, in 1978. Started his professional career at SGGS Khalsa College, Chandigarh, India. In 1986, received Ph.D. degree from Guru Nanak Dev University, Amritsar. Served several Higher Education institutions, as part of the Punjab Education Services, Govt. of Punjab, during 1980-2008. After joining Shivalik College, Nangal in 1980, he excelled in popular science communication in Punjabi and English languages, but later on focussed on Science fiction, environmental and theological writings.

Career 
After a 30 years long educational career, as Associate Professor in Physics, at Punjab Education Services, Govt. of Punjab, India, Dr. Singh moved to Canada in 2008. Herein, he founded an educational Center, dedicated to helping University/College/Senior Secondary students to achieve their academic dreams in the fields of Physical Sciences, and Humanities. Since 2013, he has served as Director, and Educational Consultant to several academic institutions in GTA, Canada. During 2014-2020, he has worked as Associate Dean at International University of California, USA and is currently working as Honorary Director, Center for Understanding Sikhism, Mississauga, ON, Canada.

Works

Physics research 
With about 100  research papers in  Physics and allied fields to his credit Dr. Singh has guided one dozen research students and supervised two M. Phil. theses. Besides, he established Acoustics Research Center, Mississauga, Canada to actively pursue his research interests in Acoustics. Having participated in about 50 conferences/ seminars within Canada and abroad, he is a member of several international research societies. In addition, he is the referee panel member of several reputed research journals of Canada, USA, Nigeria, and India.

Scientific literature 
Besides publishing 20 books and about 1000 general articles on various aspects of science and technology,  he has also translated 4 books from English to Punjabi.

Science fiction writings 
In the genre of science fiction, Dr. Singh has authored/published two books for general readers, four books for children and about 45 stories, to date, in various newspapers and magazines of Canada, USA, India, and Pakistan in Punjabi, Hindi, and English.

Sikh Theology 
As Director, Center for Understanding Sikhism, Mississauga Canada, he played a vital role in the promotion of teaching and research in Sikh Theology  in India and Canada. With three books, two booklets, and about 200 articles on Sikh theology to his credit, he has delivered about one dozen invited talks on ‘Sikh Religion and Philosophy,’ at various educational institutions within India and Canada. Five of his articles have been included in different books edited by eminent Sikh scholars. He has reviewed thirteen books authored by eminent Sikh writers.

Media 
Over 70 of his talks on Sikhism, science, and social topics have been telecast by Jhanjer TV, Sanjha Punjab TV, Channel Punjabi Toronto Dateline TV, Vision TV, and Hello Canada TV, Canada. He has also participated in the science programs of DD Punjabi, Doordarshan Jalandhar, Vision Punjab TV, Kharar, Punjab and Global Punjab TV, Chandigarh, India. Many of these talks are also available on Youtube. About 50 of his radio programs  on science and religion have been broadcast by Ajj Di Awaz Radio, Desh Punjab Radio, Parvasi Radio, Punjabi Dunia, AVR Media Productions, Canada and All India Radio, Jalandhar, India.

Awards 
 2011  "Excellent writing Award" by Ajj Di Awaz Radio & Daily Punjabi, Canada
 2010  "Life Time Achievement Award" by Peace on Earth Organization, Canada
 2006  "Lala Hardyal Memorial Award" for best Science Communication in mass media by Paryas Kala Manch, Nangal, India
 2003  "ISWA SAMMAN" for longstanding contribution to the popularisation of science, by Indian Sc. Writers’Association, N.Delhi, India
 2001  "Principal Trilochan Singh Bhatia (Children Literature and Gian Vigyan) Award", by Punjabi Sath, Lambrhan, Jalandhar, India
 2000  "Dr. M. S. Randhawa" (Gian Sahit) Award for the book Vigyan Prapatian ate Masle, by LDP, Govt. of Punjab, India
 1997  "Sarvotam Bal Sahit Pustak Purskar" for his book Robot, Manukh te Kudrat, by LDP, Govt. of Punjab, India
 1994  "Hanibal Sahit Rattan Purskar" for his book C. V. Raman-Life and Times, by Sahit Rang Gathan (Sarang Lok) , Chandigarh, India
 1991  "Sarvotam Bal Sahit Pustak Purskar" for the book Satrang, by LDP, Govt. of Punjab, India

Video links 
 World   Earth Day: Impacts of COVID 19 on the Environment of Earth
 Universal Relevance of Guru Nanak's Teachings
 Qudrat in Guru Nanak's Bani
 Environmental Teaching in Sikhism
 Aamne-Samne: Exclusive Interview

External links 
Life and Teachings of Sri Guru Tegh Bahadur Ji, 1st May 2021, Akal University, Talwandi Sabo, Bathinda, Pb., India
International Seminar on Guru Nanak's Philosophy and U. N. Agenda for Sustainable Development, 23rd Nov. 2020, Chandigarh University, Mohali, Pb., India
 4th Canadian Punjabi Conference, 5-6th July 2019, Punjabi Heritage Foundation Of Canada, Ottawa, Canada
 36th World Religions Conference: End-of-Life Decisions, 20th Nov. 2016, University of Waterloo, Canada 
 What is a Worthwhile Life? Seminar on Jivan Jach, 1st Dec. 2013, Sheridan College, Brampton, Canada
  Interview of Dr. Solomon Naz (Print Media), Christian Review: News Magazine, 2020
 Interview of Dr. Solomon Naz (e-Media), Christian Review: News Magazine, 2015

References 

Living people
Indian science fiction writers
Guru Nanak Dev University alumni
Year of birth missing (living people)